Cuima is a town and commune in the municipality of Caála, province of Huambo, Angola.

Transport 
It is the terminus of a branch railway that junctions of the Benguela Railway near Pais.

See also 

 Railway stations in Angola

References 

Populated places in Angola